The 1993–94 Liga Alef season saw Hapoel Ramat Gan (champions of the North Division) and Maccabi Kiryat Gat (champions of the South Division) win their regional divisions and promotion to Liga Artzit, along with runners-up Hapoel Kiryat Shmona and Hapoel Lod.

At the bottom, Beitar Nahariya (from the North division) and Maccabi HaShikma Ramat Hen (from the South division) finished bottom and relegated to Liga Bet.

North Division

South Division

References
Alef and Bet Leagues, 1986-87 – 1993-94  Eran R, Israblog 

Liga Alef seasons
Israel
3